Sue Hodge (born 4 June 1957) is an English actress, best known for her role as the waitress Mimi Labonq in the BBC sitcom 'Allo 'Allo!. Trained as a dancer and theatre performer at Bird College, she has performed extensively in theatre and on television in the UK and internationally, and appeared as a Force of Darkness in Terry Gilliam's 1985 film Brazil.

She returned to the role of Mimi in The Return of 'Allo 'Allo! in 2007.

In June/July 2007, she once again appeared as Mimi in the stage show 'Allo 'Allo!, alongside Gorden Kaye as René Artois and Guy Siner as Lieutenant Hubert Gruber, at Twelfth Night Theatre, in Brisbane, Australia. The other characters were portrayed by various famous Australian actors including Steven Tandy, Chloe Dallimore, Jason Gann and Tony Alcock, and Katy Manning.

Hodge returned to British television screens in 2009, portraying Connie in BBC3 sitcom The Lads Club.

In 2016 Sue starred as Nurse Mimi in the Haverhill Arts Centre production of the pantomime "Robin Hood".

Sue tours in her one woman show Mimi and Me ('Allo Again) and has written Her first book Mimi's Memoirs, both of which take you through Sue's time in front of the camera and behind the scenes of 'Allo 'Allo.

References

External links
Sue Hodge - Mimi and Me

1957 births
Living people
English television actresses
People from Orsett
Alumni of Bird College
Actresses from Essex
British comedy actresses